Time is the thirteenth feature film by South Korean director Kim Ki-duk. It premiered at the Karlovy Vary International Film Festival on June 30, 2006.

Plot 
Seh-hee and Ji-woo (Ha Jung-woo) are a young couple two years into their relationship. Though he never acts on his impulses, Ji-woo has something of a roving eye and Seh-hee is intensely jealous and fearful that Ji-woo will soon lose interest and leave her. Believing that Ji-woo is bored with seeing the same, boring her all the time, Seh-hee takes drastic action, leaving him without warning and having drastic cosmetic surgery, taking on a new face, which she hopes to use to snare him again, under an assumed identity, once she has healed. But when Ji-woo shows interest in this new and "improved" Seh-hee (Sung Hyun-ah), it triggers only more self-doubt and loathing. After all, he may love the "new" girl, but does this mean that he has rejected the old? Seh-hee is utterly trapped in her own insecurities, a situation that prompts Ji-woo to take drastic action of his own.

Production
Filming locations include Baemikkumi Sculpture Park in South Korea.

Reception
Of 34 critics counted on Rotten Tomatoes, 76% positively reviewed Time, with the critics' consensus being: "A tale of love and plastic surgery, Kim Ki-Duk's haunting film is both wryly comic and disturbing." The film holds a 73/100 on Metacritic.

Awards and nominations

References

External links 
 
 
 Film review at the Korea Society Film Journal
 Essay on Kim Ki-duk at The Korea Society Film Journal

2006 films
2006 drama films
South Korean independent films
South Korean mystery films
Films directed by Kim Ki-duk
Sponge Entertainment films
2000s Korean-language films
Works about plastic surgery
2000s South Korean films